Young Alliance may refer to:

 Young Alliance (Northern Ireland), the youth wing of the Alliance Party of Northern Ireland
 Young Alliance (Denmark), the youth wing of the New Alliance in Denmark.